Gliadorphin (also known as gluteomorphin) is an opioid peptide that is formed during digestion of the gliadin component of the gluten protein. It is usually broken down into amino acids by digestion enzymes. It has been hypothesized that children with autism have abnormal leakage from the gut of this compound. This is partly the basis for the gluten-free, casein-free diet. Abnormally high levels of gliadorphin have been found in the urine of autistic children via mass spectrometry testing.

References

Opioid peptides